Hokejovy Club 91 Senica is an ice hockey team in Senica, Slovakia. They play in the Slovak 2. Liga, the third level of Slovak ice hockey. The team was founded in 1991.

References

External links
Official website 

Senica
Senica
Ice hockey clubs established in 1946